June Considine is a best selling Irish children's author and novelist. She also uses the pen name Laura Elliot.

Biography
Born June Bolger, Considine grew up in Finglas, Dublin. She has written for adults and children. She writes under her own name and using the pen name Laura Elliot. She has written solo novels, series and short stories. She has been published in anthologies and her work has appeared on the radio. She also worked as an editor and journalist as well as a ghost writer.

Her work has won the Hennessy Literary Award and been shortlisted for the Bisto awards. Considine lives in Malahide, County Dublin.

Bibliography

Zentyre 
 When the Luvenders Came to Merrick Town (1990)
 Luvenders At the Old Mill (1990)
 Island of Luvenders (1991)

Beachwood 
 Algarve Blues (1995)
 The Debs Ball (1993)
 The School Bully (1993)
 The Slumber Party (1993)
 Summer At Fountain Square (1993)
 Puppet Strings (1994)
 Twelve Days of Christmas and Thereafter

Novels
 View from a Blind Bridge (1992) 
 The Glass Triangle (1994)
 When the Bough Breaks (2002) later renamed Fragile Lies.
 Deceptions (2004) later renamed Sleep Sister.

Novels as Laura Elliot
 The Prodigal Sister (2009)
 Stolen Child (2010)
 Fragile Lies (2015)
 The Betrayal (2015)
 Sleep Sister (2016)
 Guilty (2017)
 The Wife Before Me (2018)
 The Thorn Girl (2019)

References and sources

1945 births
21st-century Irish women writers
People from Finglas
Irish children's writers
Irish women children's writers
20th-century Irish women writers
Living people